Late Works is a studio album by John Zorn and Fred Frith. It is the fourth collaborative album by the duo, and their first studio album. It was recorded at East Side Sound in New York City on October 16, 2009, and was released by Tzadik Records in April 2010.

The album consists of improvised music by Zorn and Frith that was recorded in the studio in real time with no edits or overdubs.

Reception

AllMusic said in a review of Late Works: "Free improv isn't for everyone (listeners or performers), but it doesn't get much better than this."

Track listing
All tracks by John Zorn and Fred Frith.
"Foetid Ceremony" – 5:34
"Mosquito Slats" – 2:09
"Horse Rehab" – 5:43
"Legend of the Small" – 2:17
"Baffled Hats" – 3:20
"Movement of Harried Angels" – 7:29
"The Fourth Mind" – 9:40
"Creature Comforts" – 3:11
"Slow Lattice" – 5:58
"Ankle Time" – 5:03

Personnel
John Zorn – alto saxophone
Fred Frith – electric guitar

Sound
Marc Urselli – engineer, audio mixer
John Zorn and Fred Frith – producers

References

External links
Late Works. Tzadik Records.

2010 albums
John Zorn albums
Albums produced by John Zorn
Fred Frith albums
Albums produced by Fred Frith
Collaborative albums
Tzadik Records albums